Overload (formerly Doujin Overload) is an annual single-day anime convention focusing on doujin held in Auckland, New Zealand. It is the first of its kind to run in New Zealand.

Origins 
Overload (the Doujin Overload) was set up based on conversations in the Auckland doujin community about helping local artists showcase and sell their work, specifically inspired by the Comiket in Japan.

Programming
The convention has run as a single-day event every year apart from 2011 when it took place over two days. Aside from the sale of artists' work, it includes a comic competition (from 2012), an art exhibition (since 2012) and cosplay competition (since 2010).

History 
The conference has become more diverse over the years, such as with the dropping of 'Doujin' from the convention name and focus on wider comic work from 2011 on, and with events in recent years such as the 2011 Game Development panel, and the 2012 art exhibition at Unitec Snow White Gallery of Japanese anime artist Fuzichoco.
The event is notable for early support of cos-players from 2008 on. In 2011 former World Cosplay Champion Yuri Inaba was an invited participant of Overload.

Event History

External links 
 
 2011 Convention in Photos (stuff.co.nz)
 2009 Overload (Asia Down Under)

References 

Anime conventions in New Zealand
Book fairs in New Zealand
Comics conventions
Doujin
Recurring events established in 2006
Events in Auckland